Raiders of the Desert is a 1941 American comedy adventure film directed by John Rawlins and starring Andy Devine, Richard Arlen and Linda Hayes. The film was produced and distributed by Universal Pictures. It features an early appearance by Maria Montez. It was the first time she made a film set in the Orient.

Premise
Two adventurers, Dick and Andy, jump a ship in a Middle Eastern port, which is benefiting from the development by American businessman Jones. However some local Arabs, led by Sheikh Talifah, wish to take over. They try to assassinate Jone and succeed in killing the local Arab leader. However Dick and Andy lead a fight back which results in Talifah being killed. Dick marries Jones' secretary, Alice.

Cast
Richard Arlen as Dick Manning
Andy Devine as Andy McCoy
Linda Hayes as Alice Evans
Maria Montez as Zuleika
Lewis Howard as Abdullah
Ralf Harolde as Sheik Talifah
George Carleton as Jones
Turhan Bey as Hassen Mohammed
Harry Cording as Rawlins
Sig Arno as Suliman
Neyle Marx as Zeid
John Harmon as Ahmed

Production
Richard Arlen and Andy Devine had been teamed a number of times for Universal. Filming started in early June 1941. Maria Montez was given a role but it was a relatively small one. It was released by July of that year.

Reception
The Los Angeles Times called the film "entertaining" and that Arlen and Devine were "a very happy team... Maria Montez is attractive as an oasis charmer".

The Monthly Film Bulletin called it "a naive story presented in a crude fashion" with "some exciting moments with competent acting".

References

External links 
 
 

1941 films
1940s adventure comedy films
American adventure comedy films
Films set in the Middle East
American black-and-white films
Films directed by John Rawlins
Universal Pictures films
1940s American films